Hong Kong Adventist Hospital – Stubbs Road is one of two Seventh-day Adventist hospitals in Hong Kong, the other being Hong Kong Adventist Hospital – Tsuen Wan. It is a private hospital, and is located on Stubbs Road, on Hong Kong Island. It provides a wide range of medical services.

Hong Kong Adventist Hospital is subject to international healthcare accreditation, it has been surveyed for many years and is accredited by the UK's QHA Trent Accreditation. It has also been assessed by Joint Commission International from the US, but this ended by 2010.

See also

 List of Seventh-day Adventist hospitals
 List of Christian hospitals in China
 List of hospitals in Hong Kong

External links
Hong Kong Adventist Hospital Stubbs Road Official Website
Adventist Medical Center Official Website in English
Hong Kong Adventist Hospital Tsuen Wan Official Website in English

References

Hospital buildings completed in 1971
Hospitals in Hong Kong
Hospitals affiliated with the Seventh-day Adventist Church
Hospitals established in 1971